Mountain Music is a 1937 American comedy-musical film directed by Robert Florey.

Paramount quickly reunited Raye and Burns from their pairing in Waikiki Wedding of earlier the same year.  The plot, rooted in Burns' comic hillbilly persona from radio, revolves around a longstanding feud between two country families of Monotony, Arkansas, and an amnesia-prone groom.

This was Wally Vernon's first film.  Some sources have Charles Reisner as co-director.

Cast 

 Bob Burns as Bob Burnside
 Martha Raye as Mary Beamish
 John Howard as Ardinger Burnside
 Terry Walker as Lobelia Sheppard
 Rufe Davis as Ham Sheppard
 George "Gabby" Hayes as Granpappy Burnside 
 Spencer Charters as Justice of the Peace Sharody
 Charles Timblin as Shep Sheppard
 Jan Duggan as Ma Burnside
 Olin Howland as Pappy Burnside 
 Fuzzy Knight as Amos Burnside
 Wally Vernon as Odette Potta
 Cliff Clark as Medicine Show Proprietor
 Goodee Montgomery as Alice, Potts Showgirl
 Rita La Roy as Mrs. Hamilton B. Lovelace
 Ellen Drew as Helen
 uncredited bit players include Ward Bond, Virginia Dabney, Estelle Etterre, Florence Gill, Arthur Hohl, Priscilla Moran, Paul Newlan, and Glenn Strange.

External links 
 
 Turner Classic Movies page

1937 films
Films directed by Robert Florey
Paramount Pictures films
Films with screenplays by Charles Lederer
American black-and-white films
1937 musical comedy films
American musical comedy films
1930s American films